The Centre for the New Europe (CNE) was a free-market think tank founded in 1993 and based in Brussels. It focused on EU issues such as economic growth, managing environmental change, health and welfare policy, competition policy, and innovation.  The first director-general was Paul Fabra, former journalist at Le Monde (chief editor economics). Most recently, it was headed by Stephen Pollard, a British journalist and policy expert who previously worked at the Fabian Society and the Social Market Foundation.

As of 2005, CNE had received $40,000 from ExxonMobil.

On October 16, 2008, Pollard announced his resignation from CNE to assume the position of editor of The Jewish Chronicle.

References

External links
 Centre for the New Europe 

Political and economic think tanks based in the European Union
Think tanks based in Belgium